Deena Horst (born February 14, 1944) is a Republican former member of the Kansas House of Representatives, representing the 69th district. She served from 1995 until 2010, when she was defeated in a primary by Tom Arpke, who would win the seat in the general election.

Horst currently serves on the Kansas Board of Education, representing district 6, after defeating Salina Democrat Carol Viar in the 2012 general election. She has also served as Precinct Committee Woman for the Saline County Kansas Republican Party, and has previously worked as secretary for the Saline County Republican Party Central Committee.

A teacher by profession, she has been an Art Teacher/Department Chair with Unified School District 305, South Middle School, Salina, Kansas since 1968. Horst has a BSE from Kansas State Teachers College, an MA from Emporia State University, and is currently working towards her EdD at Kansas State University.

Issue positions
On July 22, 2020, Horst cast a vote that blocked Governor Laura Kelly's order, precipitated by the COVID-19 pandemic, to keep public schools closed until after Labor Day, at such later time as state health authorities believed primary and secondary schools could safely resume classroom education. The tied vote effectively overrode the governor's order. It also drew Horst a primary write-in opponent shortly in a race where she had not face a primary or general election candidate.

Committee membership
 Education (Vice-Chair)
 Higher Education
 Elections
 Aging and Long Term Care
 Joint Committee on Arts and Cultural Resources (Chair)

Major donors
Horst raised $21,585 in 2010. The top five donors to Horst's 2008 campaign:
1. Saline County Republican Central Cmte $1,005
2. Kansas Contractors Assoc. $1,000
3. Kansas Realtors Assoc. $900
4. Kansas Optometric Assoc. $750
5. Kansas Assoc of Insurance Agents $600

Horst raised $11,031 in 2010.The top five donors to Horst's 2010 campaign:
1. Kansas Farm Bureau $500
2. Kansas Optometric Association $500
3. Graves, Hl $500
4. Blue Beacon Intnl $500
5. Kansas Livestock Association $500

Horst raised $8,809 in 2012. The top five donors to Horst's 2012 campaign:
1. Horst, Deena $3,000
2. Horst, Deena L. $3,000
3. Graves, Helen $500
4. Geary County Republican Central Cmte $250
5. Blue Beacon International $250

See also 
 2020 Kansas elections

References

External links
 Official website
 Kansas Legislature - Deena Horst
 Project Vote Smart profile
 Kansas Votes profile
 State Surge - Legislative and voting track record
 Campaign contributions: 1998,2000, 2002, 2004, 2006, 2008,
 2010,
 2012

1944 births
Living people
Women state legislators in Kansas
Republican Party members of the Kansas House of Representatives
School board members in Kansas
20th-century American women politicians
21st-century American women politicians
Politicians from Salina, Kansas